Optimize Capital Markets was an internet-based institutional crowdfunding company located in Toronto, Canada. Optimize Capital Markets was founded in September 2009 by Matthew McGrath, a former vice-president of private client services at the Royal Bank of Canada. The company was referenced as recently as January 2014 in a Toronto-Dominion Bank Economics report, estimating that there were 60,000 angel investors in the United States.

On April 16, 2013, Optimize Capital Markets provided comments on capital raising exemptions 45-710 to the Ontario Securities Commission.

The company offered a wide range of financial services: Corporate Finance, Mergers & Acquisitions, Shareholder Liquidity, Equity Research, Advisory Services, Institutional Marketplace.

Headquarters were in Toronto, but, by appointment, it was possible to meet them even in Vancouver, Calgary, Montreal and New York (Midtown or Wall Street).

References

Crowdfunding platforms of Canada
Peer-to-peer lending companies
Private equity firms of Canada
Venture capital firms of Canada
Equity crowdfunding platforms